Lac d'Onoz is a lake at Onoz in the Jura department of France.

References 

Onoz